The Singapore Internet Exchange (SGIX) is an Internet Exchange Point (IXP) with PoPs in major Data Centers within Singapore having around 90 peering members.  The exchange was founded on 30 September 2009 as a company limited by guarantee in Singapore.

See also
List of Internet exchange points

References

External links
 Official website
 Traffic statistics

Internet exchange points in Singapore